This is a list of notable Labanas.

Early Sikh Labanas

 Bhai Mansukh – first Labana trader to preach Sikhism in Sri Lanka region
 Bhai Dasa Labana – Devout Sikh leader and preacher
 Baba Makhan Shah Labana – Preacher of Sikhism

Politicians
 Bibi Jagir Kaur – First woman to be elected as the president of the Shiromani Gurdwara Prabandhak Committee (SGPC)

References

Labanas
List